Behchokǫ̀ ([bɛ́ht͡ʃʰókʰõ̀] or [bɛ́ht͡sʰókʰõ̀]) (from the Tłı̨chǫ meaning "Behcho's place"), officially the Tłı̨chǫ Community Government of Behchokǫ̀, is a community in the North Slave Region of the Northwest Territories, Canada.

History 
The north arm of Great Slave Lake is the traditional territory of the Tłı̨chǫ (Dogrib), a northern Dene (formerly called Athapaskan) group. Explorer Samuel Hearne was the first European to encounter Dogrib-speaking people while crossing the lands north of Great Slave Lake in 1772. Later, in 1789, trader Alexander Mackenzie traveled by canoe very close to their territory while trading with the Yellowknives, another First Nations peoples, along the north arm of the big lake.

The first trading post in this region was at the entrance of Yellowknife Bay, established in 1789 by the North West Company, a post known as Old Fort Providence. It was established for the benefit of both the Yellowknives and Dogrib Dene but it was not a significant trading centre and closed in 1823. Dogrib Dene were then required to enter into trade with Hudson's Bay Company posts on the south side of Great Slave Lake at Fort Resolution at the mouth of the Slave River. Historically, the Dogrib and the Yellowknives Dene have quarrelled. By the 1830s, Edzo, the Dogrib leader and Akaitcho, the Yellowknives leader, made peace. Afterwards, the Dogrib's returned to their traditional hunting grounds.

Fort Rae was first established on a prominent peninsula on the north shore of the north arm of Great Slave Lake in 1852 as a wintering provision post for the Hudson's Bay Company. It was named for Scotsman explorer John Rae, who was among the explorers looking for remains of Sir John Franklin's expedition in the Arctic. It became an important trading post for the Dogrib Dene. In the early 20th century, free traders penetrated a monopoly previously held by the HBC. Ed Nagle and Jack Hislop opened a new trading post at the very northern tip of the north arm where Marian Lake connects to Great Slave Lake. As this location was much closer to many of the Dene families living on the land, it became the area of choice for trade. The HBC abandoned the old Fort Rae and set up a post next to Hislop and Nagle.

As the community grew alongside increased services such as a mission-run hospital and church, the government viewed the topography of Fort Rae as unsuitable for expansion. In the 1950s there was concern about runoff from animal and human wastes contaminating sources of drinking water, and the government proposed constructing a new settlement on more favourable terrain. The community became known as Edzo and was located on the west side of the Frank Channel opposite Fort Rae a  drive away. Most of the Dene families refused to move from their community so that Rae and Edzo (Rae-Edzo) became two separate communities although administered together.

The name Rae-Edzo was changed 4 August 2005 to Behchokǫ̀. The biggest names in Tłı̨chǫ history are Edzo, Bruneau, and Monfwi. All men were Dogrib chiefs at important periods in their cultural history; Edzo signed the peace pact with the Yellowknives Dene in the 1820s, Jimmy Bruneau was a long-standing chief in the 20th century, and Monfwi signed Treaty 11 with the Canadian Government in 1921 and created the Tłı̨chǫ annual assembly in 1932.

Before 2005, the community was unincorporated, and most local governance was provided by a First Nations band government, Dog Rib Rae First Nation. Under the terms of the Tłı̨chǫ Agreement, most responsibilities of Dog Rib Rae have been transferred to the Behchokǫ̀ Community Government. However, the First Nation is still recognized by the federal government for Indian Act enrollment.

Demographics 

According to the 2016 Census the Indigenous population was made up of 1,695 First Nations and 50 Métis people.

First Nations
One of the four Tłı̨chǫ communities, it is the largest Dene community in Canada. Behchokǫ̀ was the site of the signing of the Tłı̨chǫ land claim agreement that brought about the Tlicho Government.

Transportation

The main street within Behchokǫ̀ is Donda Tili, which connects to the Yellowknife Highway and then to either Yellowknife or south to Fort Providence and southern Canada. Three ice roads are available during winter to connect to Gamètì, Wekweètì and Whatì to the north and west.

The closest major public airport is Yellowknife Airport via an hour drive east. Nearby Rae/Edzo Airport is a private airport.

Services

Religious
 Tlicho Baptist Church
 St Michael's Catholic Church

Community
 Elizabeth Mackenzie Elementary School in Rae (K-6)
 Chief Jimmy Bruneau School in Edzo (K-12)
 Kǫ̀ Gocho Complex - new recreation centre
 Behchokǫ̀ Cultural Centre - community centre
 Tłı̨chǫ Friendship Centre

Businesses
 Tli Cho Hotel - catering to tourist and visitors
 Northern Store and Gas Bar
 F & C Services - convenience store and stop for Frontier Coachlines
 Hyway3 Bus Charters and Freight Services - connects to Edmonton and other parts of the NWT
 Trappers Hideaway Restaurant
 Rabesca Resources Ltd - outfitters

Government
 Tłı̨chǫ Government Main Office
 N.W.T. Housing Corporation - public housing
 Municipal Services - sewage, water, public works
 Fire Department - volunteer service with two fire stations located in nearby Rae and Edzo
 Policing - local Royal Canadian Mounted Police detachment
 EMS - located at Mary Adele Bishop Health Centre with one ambulance

Medical

There is no hospital in town; the nearest is Stanton Territorial Hospital in Yellowknife and only basic health services are provided by Mary Adele Bishop Health Centre. The local dental clinic is private and there is a Mental Health and Addictions Services centre.

Housing issues

Behchokǫ̀ has been facing a long term and chronic housing crisis due to multiple issues: insufficient funding for affordable units, disrepair of existing housing stock and inability of many living in public housing to pay rent.

See also
 List of municipalities in the Northwest Territories

Further reading
 Northwest Territories, and BHP Billiton Diamonds Inc. Communities and Diamonds Socio-Economic Impacts in the Communities of: Behchokǫ̀, Gameti, Whati, Wekweeti, Detah, Ndilo, Lutsel Kʼe, and Yellowknife : 2005 Annual Report of the Government of the Northwest Territories Under the BHP Billiton, Diavik and De Beers Socio-Economic Agreements. [Yellowknife]: Govt. of the Northwest Territories, 2006.

References

External links

Communities in the North Slave Region
Tłı̨chǫ community governments in the Northwest Territories
Dene communities